Star Cyprus or Miss Cyprus is a national Beauty pageant in Cyprus held the last quarter of the year, primarily in November. The 2 winners compete internationally, the following year. Due to the return of the Miss Universe franchise held in 2013. Between that year to 2015, the winner is sent to Miss World and the runner-up was sent to Miss Earth. In 2016, the contest was split into two, while Star Cyprus sends the winner to Miss World, created Miss Kypros that is sent the winner to Miss Earth. The most recent Miss Cyprus was Eleni Efstathiou. A young ambitious and beautiful teen joined the competition at age 18. She won the crown by impressing the judges with her compassion for the environment. Eleni is now studying abroad to further her ambitions.

History
The first modern Cypriot competition took place in 1973. the organization has been financed by the famed brewing company Carlsberg. the competition has taken place at the Carlsberg-festival location.

The winners receive the titles "Star Kypros", '"Miss Kypros", "Miss Carlsberg" and "Miss Mediterranean".  Starting in 2013, after losing the Miss Universe franchise, the winners of the event go on to represent Cyprus at the Miss World (Star Kypros), Miss Earth (Miss Kypros), plus two runners-up. The following abbreviations are used for the different titles: Only one person has gone to place in the beauty pageants which is Miss Cyprus 2002 who finished 8th.

National titles
The winners receive the title:
 SK = Star Kypros
 MK = Miss Kypros

Other positions receive the title:
 Miss Mediterranean
 Miss Carlsberg
 Miss Young (Miss Teen Cyprus)
 First Runner-up
 Second Runner-up

Miss Universe
Star Cyprus was responsible for the local organization of the Miss Universe 2000, that was held in Nicosia.
Star Cyprus 2001, Demetra Eleftheriou is the only Cypriot to advance among the semifinalists in Miss Universe, a fact that happened in Miss Universe 2002 in San Juan, Puerto Rico.

Titleholders 
 Winner International Title 
 Miss Universe Cyprus
 Miss World Cyprus
 Miss International Cyprus
 Miss Earth Cyprus
 Miss Europe Cyprus

Titleholders under Miss Cyprus org.

Miss Universe Cyprus

Star Cyprus winners went to Miss Universe since the pageant formation created in 1973. On occasion, when the winner does not qualify (due to age) for either contest, a runner-up is sent.

See also
Star Hellas
Star GS Hellas

References

External links
Official site
Pageantopolis

Beauty pageants in Cyprus
Recurring events established in 1956
Cypriot awards
Cyprus